is a passenger railway station located in Minami-ku in the city of Sagamihara, Kanagawa Prefecture, Japan, and is operated by the East Japan Railway Company (JR East).

Lines

Station layout
Kobuchi Station has a two opposed side platforms serving two tracks, connected to the station building by a footbridge. The tracks are set in a cutting, and the elevated station building's exit is at ground level. The station has a Midori no Madoguchi staffed ticket office.

Platforms

History 
Kobuchi Station was opened on 13 March 1988.

Station numbering was introduced on 20 August 2016 with Kobuchi being assigned station number JH24.

Passenger statistics
In fiscal 2019, the station was used by an average of 23,002 passengers daily (boarding passengers only).

The passenger figures (boarding passengers only) for previous years are as shown below.

Surrounding area
Sagamihara City Ono Elementary School
Sagamihara City Fuchinobe Higashi Elementary School
Sagamihara City Onodai Central Elementary School
Kitasato University Hospital

See also
List of railway stations in Japan

References

External links

Station information page 

Railway stations in Kanagawa Prefecture
Railway stations in Japan opened in 1988
Railway stations in Sagamihara
Yokohama Line